Topolná is a municipality and village in Uherské Hradiště District in the Zlín Region of the Czech Republic. It has about 1,600 inhabitants.

In Topolná there is the central longwave broadcasting facility of the Czech Republic, Topolná transmitter.

References

Villages in Uherské Hradiště District